Craspedosoma is a genus of millipedes belonging to the family Craspedosomatidae.

The species of this genus are found in Europe and Northern America.

Species:
 Craspedosoma aculeatum Menge, 1854 
 Craspedosoma aegonotum Attems, 1926

References

Chordeumatida
Millipede families